Andrew Fensome (born 18 February 1969 in Northampton) is a former English footballer and he was assistant manager of Hereford United, until he was sacked on 4 October 2010.

He began his career as an apprentice at Norwich City before moving to Cambridge United.

He signed for Preston North End for a £7,500 fee in October 1993 and was named as the club's Player of the Year in the 1994–95 season. In total, he made 105 appearances for the Deepdale club and scored 2 goals.
 
He was transferred to Rochdale in July 1996.

He coached at former club Preston North End and worked as a match summariser for BBC Radio Lancashire before joining Hereford United as assistant to manager Simon Davey in June 2010.

References

External links

1969 births
Living people
Footballers from Northampton
English footballers
Association football defenders
Norwich City F.C. players
Bury Town F.C. players
Newcastle United F.C. players
Cambridge United F.C. players
Preston North End F.C. players
Rochdale A.F.C. players
Morecambe F.C. players
Preston North End F.C. non-playing staff